Anomaloglossus shrevei (common name: Shreve's rocket frog) is a species of frog in the family Aromobatidae. It is endemic to Venezuela where it is only known from the Cerro Marahuaca and Cerro Duida, two adjacent tepuis. These frogs live near streams in tropical rainforest. It is not a common species but the population may be presently stable and is protected by Parque Nacional Duida-Marahuaca.

References

shrevei
Amphibians of Venezuela
Endemic fauna of Venezuela
Taxonomy articles created by Polbot
Amphibians described in 1961
Amphibians of the Tepuis